Scotforth is a civil parish in City of Lancaster district, Lancashire, England. It does not include the suburb Scotforth, but is further south, comprising areas to the west, north and north-east of Lancaster University.

In the 2011 census the population was recorded as 321.

There are five listed buildings in Scotforth: four houses and a bridge over the River Conder. All are Grade II listed buildings.

There are two reservoirs in the parish. Blea Tarn Reservoir was constructed 1896-1901 and the BFI has a film by Mitchell and Kenyon of its opening in 1902.  Langthwaite Reservoir was constructed in 1935, and United Utilities began work in 2018 on the construction of a floating solar farm on its surface.

Scotforth has a parish council.

History 
Scotforth was formerly a township, it became a civil parish in 1866. The parish formerly included the settlement: on 9 November 1900 the northern, urban, part of the parish was transferred to Lancaster and on 1 April 1935 a further  were transferred to Lancaster. The population of the parish was 1,139 in 1871, 2,263 in 1881 and 1,598 in 1891 but reduced to 251 in 1901.

References

Further reading

External links

 

Geography of the City of Lancaster
Civil parishes in Lancashire